Trevor Brown can refer to:

 Trevor Brown (artist), English artist
 Trevor Brown (baseball) (born 1991), American baseball player
 Trevor Brown (cricketer, born 1933) (19332014), South African cricketer
 Trevor Brown (cricketer, born 1940) (born 1940), South African cricketer
 Trevor Brown (table tennis) (born 1979), Australian table tennis player